Operário Futebol Clube, commonly referred to as Operário de Campo Grande, Operário-MS or simply Operário is a Brazilian professional club based in Campo Grande, Mato Grosso do Sul founded on 21 August 1938. It competes in the Campeonato Sul-Mato-Grossense, the top flight of the Mato Grosso do Sul state football league.

Operário is currently ranked third among Mato Grosso do Sul teams in CBF's national club ranking, at 179th place overall.

History
The club was founded on August 28, 1938, by civil construction workers of Campo Grande. The name Operário means Factory Worker in Portuguese.

In 1982 the club won the President's Cup, played in South Korea.

Since November 29, 1999, Operário is an enterprise. Because of this, the team name changed from Operário Futebol Clube to Operário Futebol Clube S/A. S/A means joint-stock company.

Currently Operário is in a very serious financial crisis and most of its debts are labor debts and tax debts.

Stadium

Home stadium is the Morenão, capacity 45,000.

Rivalries

Operário's biggest rival is Comercial, with whom he plays the Clássico Comerário (Comerário derby), the biggest of the Mato Grosso do Sul state and one of the largest in the central-west region of Brazil.

Honours
 Campeonato Sul-Mato-Grossense
 Winners (12): 1979, 1980, 1981, 1983, 1986, 1988, 1989, 1991, 1996, 1997, 2018, 2022

 Campeonato Mato-Grossense
 Winners (4): 1974, 1976, 1977, 1978

 President's Cup (Korea)
 Winners (1): 1982

References

External links
 Official Site
 Operário-MS on Globo Esporte

Operário Futebol Clube (MS)
Association football clubs established in 1938
Football clubs in Mato Grosso do Sul
Football clubs in Brazil
Campo Grande
1938 establishments in Brazil